The 2000–01 Moldovan National Division was the 10th season of top-tier football in Moldova.

Overview
It was contested by 8 teams and Sheriff Tiraspol won the championship.

League standings

Results

First and second round

Third and fourth round

Relegation/promotion play-off

Petrocub-Condor Sărata-Galbenă were promoted after Haiduc-Sporting Hîncești withdrew.

Top goalscorers

References
Moldova - List of final tables (RSSSF)

Moldovan Super Liga seasons
1
Moldova